Paraswammerdamia lapponica is a moth of the family Yponomeutidae. It is found in Fennoscandia and northern Russia.

The wingspan is 13–15 mm. Adults are on wing from June to July.

The larvae feed on Betula nana.

References

Moths described in 1932
Yponomeutidae
Moths of Europe